John Charles Schmitt  (born November 12, 1942) is a former American football center in the National Football League (NFL) who played ten seasons for the New York Jets, from whom he started in Super Bowl III. He ended his career in 1974 with the Green Bay Packers. He was inducted into the Suffolk Sports Hall of Fame on Long Island in the Football Category with the Class of 1992.
He also lost his Super Bowl ring in the ocean until a lifeguard found it and kept it. When the lifeguard died, someone going through his belongings found the ring.

External links
NFL.com player page

1942 births
Living people
People from Brooklyn
American football centers
Hofstra Pride football players
New York Jets players
Green Bay Packers players
American Football League players